The Delfines del Carmen (English: Carmen Dolphins) were a Mexican Baseball League expansion club based in Ciudad del Carmen, Campeche. They played their home games at the Estadio Resurgimiento in Ciudad del Carmen.

History 
In November 2011, Colombian entrepreneur Carlos Mejía bought the Tecolotes de Nuevo Laredo and moved them to Campeche, giving the state two baseball teams alongside the Piratas de Campeche.

The Delfines del Carmen operated in a span of five years from 2012 through 2016 as members of the LMB Zona Sur. They had only two winning seasons, made the playoffs in 2013 and 2014 – including the division title in 2013 – and posted the second worst record of the league in 2016. The team folded at the end of the season.

In November 2016, the Mexican League announced that the franchise would be moved for the 2017 season to Durango, Durango, playing as the Generales de Durango.

Seasons

Notable players 

Winston Abreu
Adán Amezcua
Willy Aybar
Tim Corcoran
Tiago da Silva
Yadir Drake
Freddy Guzmán
Esteban Loaiza
Josh Lueke
Rubén Mateo
Xavier Paul
René Reyes
Rubén Rivera
Henry Rodríguez
Sandy Rosario
Kalian Sams
Gabe Suárez

References

External links 
Baseball Reference – Mexican League (AAA) Encyclopedia and History

Defunct baseball teams in Mexico
Baseball teams in Mexico
Defunct minor league baseball teams
Baseball teams established in 2012
Sports clubs disestablished in 2016
Defunct Mexican League teams